Kishore Kumar Pardasani (also known as Dolly) is an Indian film director known for his Telugu films Konchem Ishtam Konchem Kashtam, Tadakha, Gopala Gopala and Katamarayudu.

Early life and career
Kishore was born in Vijayawada and was brought up in Vijayanagaram. After pursuing law at Maharaja College at Vijayanagaram, Kishore shifted to Hyderabad and joined the film industry and went to assist Sreenu Vaitla and V. V. Vinayak.

Kishore made his directorial debut with Konchem Ishtam Konchem Kashtam (2009). He came up with the idea of interval point first during the scripting stage. He then approached Siddharth who accepted to act after hearing the script. The film received positive reviews and did well.

Filmography

References

External links
 

Living people
Telugu film directors
Indian filmmakers
21st-century Indian film directors
Film directors from Andhra Pradesh
Year of birth missing (living people)